Nasir Bagh was an Afghan refugee camp on the edge of Peshawar in North-West Frontier Province (known in Afghanistan as "شمال مغربی سرحدی صوبہ Śhumāl Maġribī Sarhadī Sūbha") province of Pakistan. The camp was opened in 1980 following the outbreak of the Soviet-Afghan War and at one time had a population of 100,000 refugees. The camp was closed down by UNHCR in May 2002, with most refugees returning to Afghanistan (the Taliban were ousted by then) and the remaining moving to other camps in the region.

See also 
 Muhajir Afghan
 Sharbat Gula
 List of parks and gardens in Lahore
 List of parks and gardens in Pakistan
 List of parks and gardens in Karachi

References 

http://pk.geoview.info/nasir_garden,48609475p

External links
 No Way Back for Nasir Bagh Refugees
 Nasir Bagh in Peshawar 

Refugee camps in Pakistan
Afghan refugee camps
Populated places in Peshawar District
Afghan diaspora in Pakistan